Banglalink Digital Communications Ltd., d.b.a. Banglalink (previously Orascom Telecom Bangladesh Ltd.) is a Bangladeshi telecommunications company headquartered in Dhaka. It's the third-largest mobile network operator in Bangladesh.

Banglalink attained 1 million subscribers by December 2005, and 3 million subscribers by October 2006. In less than two years, by December 2007, Banglalink overtook Aktel (now Robi) to become the second-largest operator in Bangladesh with more than 7.1 million customers.

Banglalink had 1.03 million connections until December 2005. The number of Banglalink users increased by 257% and stood at 3.64 million at the end of 2006, making it the fastest-growing operator in the world of that year. In August 2006, Banglalink became the first company to provide free incoming calls from BTTB for both postpaid and prepaid connections. On 20 August 2008, Banglalink got past the landmark of a 10 million subscriber base. As of August 2021, Banglalink has a subscriber base of 36.90 million.

History
Sheba Telecom (Pvt.) Ltd. was granted license in 1989 to operate in the rural areas of 199 upazilas. Later it obtained nationwide 15-year GSM license in November 1996 to extend its business to cellular mobile, radio telephone services. It launched operation in the last quarter of 1997 as a Bangladesh-Malaysia joint venture.

In July 2004, it was reported that Egypt based Orascom Telecom is set to purchase the Malaysian stakes in Sheba Telecom through a hush-hush deal, as Sheba had failed to tap the business potentials in Bangladesh mainly due to a chronic feud between its Malaysian and Bangladeshi partners. An agreement was reached with Orascom worth US$25 million was finalized in secret. The pact has been kept secret for legal reasons, considering financial fallout and because of the feud. The main reason for the undercover dealing was the joint venture agreement between the Bangladeshi and the Malaysian partners, which dictates that if any party sells its Sheba shares, the other party will enjoy the first right to buy that.

Integrated Services Ltd. (ISL), the Bangladeshi partner, was being 'officially' shown as purchasing the shares held by Technology Resources Industries (TRI) of Malaysia for $15 million. ISL then paid another $10 million to Standard Chartered Bank to settle Sheba's liabilities.

In September 2004, Orascom Telecom Holdings purchased 100% of the shares of Sheba Telecom (Pvt.) Limited. It was acquired for US$60 million. Sheba had a base of 59,000 users, of whom 49,000 were regular when it was sold. Afterward it was re-branded and launched its services under the "Banglalink" brand on 10 February 2005.

In March 2008, Sheba Telecom (Pvt.) Limited changed its name to Orascom Telecom Bangladesh Limited, matching its parent company name.

In July 2013, following the 2011 ownership restructuring in the parent company, the company name changed for the second time to Banglalink Digital Communications Ltd.

Numbering scheme

Banglalink uses the following numbering scheme:

+88019N1N2N3N4N5N6N7N8 & +880140N1N2N3N4N5N6N7

Where '+880' is the ISD code for Bangladesh and is needed only in case of dialing from outside Bangladesh.

'19' & '140' are the access codes for Banglalink as allocated by the Government of Bangladesh. Omitting +880 will require using 0 in place of it instead to represent local call, hence 019 & 0140 are the general access codes. N1N2N3N4N5N6N7N8 is the subscriber number.

Network 
Banglalink is the third-largest mobile operator of the country. As of October 2021, Banglalink has a total of 10,200 base transceiver station (BTS) across the country.

Products offered

Prepaid packages

Banglalink currently offers two prepaid plans. All the prepaid plans come in two phases—Standard (T&T incoming and outgoing with nationwide dialling and ISD) and M2M. All connections provide EDGE, GPRS, 3G, HSPA, HSPA+, 4G, LTE to subscribers.
Desh, with the slogan Ek Desh Ek Rate! (means one country one rate!), is one of the cheapest prepaid plans in the country by the tariff. It also has three FnF numbers (Friends and Family) with cheaper rates for frequent call destinations. Desh was launched in 2006.
Desh rang was launched as a brand extension of desh. Rang is a Bengali word that means color. It is introduced with the catchphrase Rangiye Din Apnar Jeebon (means colour your life.). This package is aimed at customers who mainly make calls to their own network and are heavy SMS users. It offers four on-net FnF numbers, but no off-net FnF number.
Former packages:
Regular prepaid was the first package Banglalink had to offer. It is currently unavailable in the market.
Ladies, first!, with the slogan Shomporker Network (which means network of relationships), was tailored for women. It offered four FnF numbers. It was launched in 2005 and is currently unavailable in the market. It introduced a 1-second pulse in the prepaid market.
 Be linked! was launched in 2005. It was later taken over by Desh package as all the Be linked! customers were automatically migrated to Desh.

Postpaid packages
Currently, there are three postpaid plans from Banglalink for its tail customers. These packages are known as Enterprise Personal, which is a subset of much larger Banglalink enterprise. All packages come with T&T local, nationwide dialing, ISD, and e-ISD connectivity.
Personal package
Personal supplementary
Personal call and control
Former packages:
Upper class, a postpaid platform, was launched on 31 July 2005. It was mainly targeting slightly upscale consumers. the upper class was known for offering separate counters at sales and customer care centers and a dedicated hotline. It had numerous packages under two different tariff plans—tailor made and made to measure. In addition to those, it introduced a hybrid product named  call and control designed to offer the value of postpaid with the control of prepaid. Later Enterprise Personal took control of the upper class.

Banglalink Enterprise
Banglalink Enterprise offers a wide range of products and services to suit the needs of the business community. It was first launched in December 2006. The current packages are:
Enterprise corporate; targeted at the corporate segment
Enterprise SME; targeted at the SME segment
Enterprise personal
Before the launch of Banglalink enterprise, Banglalink served the business clientele through a similar platform named Banglalink professional.

Banglalink customer care
Banglalink delivers customer care using its call centers and customer care networks. Currently, Banglalink provides customer care services to its clients through:
Banglalink sales & care centres
Banglalink points Banglalink Points are aimed at providing connections, handsets, accessories and provide selected customer services like SIM replacement, reconnection, bill payment etc. They are located at key points around the country. Kallol Group, a local distribution company, had partnered with Banglalink to operate at least forty Banglalink points throughout the country. As of March 2008, the deal with Kallol Group has been called off and Banglalink is focusing on managing its own customer care centers.
Banglalink service points
Banglalink care lines are call centres.

Digital services
Banglaflix -  Video streaming service
Banglalink App Store - Subscription-based app store. Powered by Bemobi
Banglalink Boighor - eBook service
Banglalink Islamic Portal - Islamic content service
Bangla Dhol - Music streaming service
Bhoutik - Video streaming service
BL Vibe -  Music streaming service
Clickplay - Online gaming service
Toffee - Live TV & video streaming Service

Criticisms and penalty
In October 2007, BTRC fined Banglalink BDT 1.25 billion for its involvement in illegal VoIP or call termination business. The then BTRC chairman, major general (retd.) Manzurul Alam, confirmed Banglalink's involvement in the illegal trade. In a statement issued by Banglalink, the company agreed to make a one-time fixed payment of Tk. 1.25  billion to the government as compensation for its loss in revenues.

References

Communications in Bangladesh
Mobile phone companies of Bangladesh
Telecommunications companies of Bangladesh
VEON
Telecommunications companies established in 1999